The 1945 Cork Intermediate Hurling Championship was the 36th staging of the Cork Intermediate Hurling Championship since its establishment by the Cork County Board in 1909.

1st Battalion won the championship following a 3-11 to 0-04 defeat of Oldcastletown in the final. This remains their only championship title.

Results

Final

References

Cork Intermediate Hurling Championship
Cork Intermediate Hurling Championship